Dragon Ball Z: Bio-Broly, known in Japan as  or by Toei's own English title Dragon Ball Z: Attack! Super Warriors, is a 1994 Japanese animated science fiction martial arts film and the eleventh Dragon Ball Z feature film. It was released in Japan on July 9 at the Toei Anime Fair alongside Dr. Slump and Arale-chan: N-cha!! Excited Heart of Summer Vacation and the second Slam Dunk film. It was the third Dragon Ball Z film to feature the character of Broly, albeit as a genetic clone.

Plot 

In a laboratory, humanoids emerge from tanks after having been created by the scientist Dr. Collie whose employer, Mr. Jaguar, plans to use these humanoids to expose the "world's greatest fraud", and laughs madly as a muscular, nude man with a tail lays dormant in another tank.

Android 18 harasses Mr. Satan as he has yet to pay her for purposely losing to him in the World Martial Arts Tournament final while Krillin, Trunks, Goten and Marron wait outside. A businessman named Men-Men arrives and speaks with Mr. Satan, telling him that Mr. Jaguar, who was Mr. Satan's rival at summer camp, has requested his presence on his island laboratory to have him fight his special fighters, and threatens to expose Mr. Satan as a bed wetter if he refuses. Mr. Satan reluctantly accepts with Android 18 accompanying them to make sure Mr. Satan keeps good on his promise for payment. Trunks and Goten stow away, hoping to find a challenging fight.

On the island, a tournament is organized to pit Jaguar's bio-warriors against Mr. Satan. Android 18, Goten and Trunks ask to take part by posing as his pupils. Goten and Trunks easily defeat the bio-warriors and they observe the excommunicated shaman from the village they encountered during their fight with Broly. Trunks and Goten explore the lab and find a tank which appears to house Broly who is supposed to be dead. They confront the shaman who tells them that after Broly was killed, he found a sample of the Legendary Super Saiyan's blood and took it to Jaguar, who used it to have a clone created. Goten and Trunks attempt to destroy the clone but he breaks out of the tank and attacks them. The ensuing struggle causes a major leak of a dangerous bio-fluid that instantly devours matter. The Broly clone is drenched in the bio-fluid and becomes deformed. Jaguar orders Bio-Broly to kill Mr. Satan but Android 18 saves him and is subsequently defeated. Goten and Trunks battle Bio-Broly while the bio-fluid kills all of the bio-warriors, scientists, and the shaman.

Bio-Broly pummels Goten, Trunks, and Android 18. Krillin saves Android 18 but is also defeated. Trunks lures Bio-Broly beneath a bio-fluid tank and destroys it, showering Bio-Broly in more of the fluid which appears to damage him. They attempt to evacuate the island but Dr. Collie tells them that the bio-fluid will continue to spread until it covers the entire Earth. However, they discover that the fluid turns to stone upon contact with seawater so Goten, Trunks and Krillin each fire a Kamehameha wave at the base of the island, causing a massive wave of seawater to flood the island and turn the fluid to stone. A colossal sized Bio-Broly suddenly emerges from the sea but before he is able to attack, he too becomes solidified. Goten, Trunks, and Krillin blast him with a combined Kamehameha wave which destroys him.

In the Other World, Goku receives orders from King Kai to help stop Broly who is rampaging in Hell.

Voice cast

Notes

Music 
OP (Opening Theme):
 "We Gotta Power"
 Lyrics by Yukinojō Mori
 Music and arrangement by Keiju Ishikawa
 Performed by Hironobu Kageyama
IN (Insert Song):

 Lyrics by Yukinojō Mori
 Music by Tetsuji Hayashi
 Arranged by Osamu Totsuka
 Performed by Susumu Oya
ED (Ending Theme):

 Lyrics by Yukinojo Mori
 Music by Tetsuji Hayashi
 Arranged by Osamu Totsuka
 Performed by Hironobu Kageyama

Singles 

"Dragon Power ∞" was released as a single on 8 mm CD on July 21, 1994 in Japan. It was coupled with the image song "Chīsa na Senshi~Goten to Trunks no Tēma~" performed by Susumu Ōya.

Another CD called  was released on 12 mm CD at the same time as the 8 mm CD. This 12 mm CD features a third track, also performed by Kageyama.

English dub soundtrack 
The score for the English dub's composed by Mark Menza. The Triple Feature release contains an alternate audio track containing the English dub with original Japanese background music by Shunsuke Kikuchi, an opening theme of "We Gotta Power", and an ending theme of "Dragon Power ∞".

Releases 
It was released on DVD in North America on September 13, 2005. It was later released in Triple Feature set along with Broly – The Legendary Super Saiyan (1993) and Broly – Second Coming (1994) for Blu-ray and DVD on March 31, 2009, both feature full 1080p format in HD remastered 16:9 aspect ratio and an enhanced 5.1 surround mix. The film was re-released to DVD in final remastered thinpak collection on January 3, 2012, containing the last 4 Dragon Ball Z films.

Other companies 
A second English dub produced and released exclusively in Malaysia by Speedy Video features an unknown voice cast.

References

External links 
 Official anime website of Toei Animation
 
 

1994 anime films
Films about cloning
Bio-Broly
Films directed by Yoshihiro Ueda
Funimation
Toei Animation films

Films scored by Shunsuke Kikuchi